Jeanne d'Arc Girubuntu (born 6 May 1995) is a Rwandan road cyclist. She became Rwandan national road race and time trial champion in 2014. In 2015, she was invited to train at the World Cycling Centre in Switzerland for three months. She was the first Rwandan female rider to do so, and the 1000th rider to train at the WCC.

Major results

2013
 8th Road race, African Junior Road Championships
2014
 National Road Championships
1st  Road race
1st  Time trial
2015
 4th Time trial, African Games
 African Road Championships
5th Road race
6th Time trial
2016
 National Road Championships
1st  Road race
1st  Time trial
 2nd  Time trial, African Road Championships
2017
 3rd Time trial, National Road Championships
 8th Time trial, African Road Championships
2018
 3rd  Team time trial, African Road Championships

References

External links
 

1995 births
African Games competitors for Rwanda
Competitors at the 2015 African Games
Living people
Place of birth missing (living people)
Rwandan female cyclists